Agrionympha capensis is a species of moth belonging to the family Micropterigidae. It was described by Whalley in 1978. It is known from South Africa, where it is found in the Western and Eastern Cape districts.

The length of the forewings is 2.6–3 mm for males and 2.9–3.4 mm for females.

Adults have been found on low macchia (or fynbos) vegetation in the Cape area.

References

Endemic moths of South Africa
Micropterigidae
Moths described in 1978
Moths of Africa